Le'ala Shoreline is located near Taputimu, just west of Fagatele Point, on Tutuila Island in American Samoa. It is a U.S. National Natural Landmark. The coast is marked by rocky outcroppings, deep and shallow surge channels, as well as tide pools and a mixture of coconut, scrub and grass forest. “Sliding Rock” is located nearby. Le’ala Shoreline is a young flow of basalt, inter-bedded with layers of tuff that illustrate erosion by wave action. The area is covered with dense tropical vegetation. Le’ala Shoreline was designated a U.S. National Natural Landmark in 1972. The National Natural Landmark covers 35 acres.

The Le’ala Shoreline Trail begins in Vailoatai and follows the shoreline through thick tropical vegetation with periodic views of the Lea'ala Shoreline National Natural Landmark. The steep trail travels in and out of ancient volcanic craters before ending at a junction with the Fagatele Bay National Marine Sanctuary Trail. It is a 3.2-mile roundtrip hike.

See also
List of National Natural Landmarks in American Samoa

References

National Natural Landmarks in American Samoa
Tutuila